INS Romach is an Israeli missile boat, one of ten s. She was launched in 1981 by Israel Shipyards at the Port of Haifa. She has been a part of Israeli Navy since October 1981.

Construction 
New ships were longer, so they take an augmented armament.

INS Romach was built at the Israel Shipyards in Port of Haifa. She was launched on 30 October 1981.

Description 

Romach, as other Sa'ar 4.5-class missile boats, has a flush deck, short superstructure located in front of the midship and freeboard. The full load displacement is 488 tonnes.

The primary armament is two quadruple launchers of American Harpoon anti-ship missiles, allocated directly behind the superstructure.

The secondary armament consists of single, dual purpose gun OTO Melara 76 mm, allocated abaft in a gun turret. The angle of elevation is 85°. The bow is armed with close-in weapon system, Phalanx CIWS.

References 

1981 ships
Ships built in Israel
Sa'ar 4.5-class missile boats
Naval ships of Israel
Missile boats of the Israeli Navy